Arjun or Arjuna may refer to

People
 Arjun (name), a common male given name (including a list of persons with the name)
 Arjuna, a character of the Hindu epic Mahabharata
 Kartavirya Arjuna, a character in Hindu mythology
 Arjun (Firoz Khan) (fl. 1984–2016), Indian actor
 Arjun (singer) (born 1990), Arjun Coomaraswamy, British-Sri Lankan singer-songwriter

Arts and entertainment

Books
 Arjun (character), a fictional young detective from a book series by Samaresh Majumdar
 Arjun (The Vampire Chronicles), a fictional character in novels by Anne Rice

Films 
 Arjun (1985 film), a 1985 Hindi film
 Arjun (2004 film), a 2004 Telugu film
 Arjun (2008 film), a 2008 Kannada film
 Arjun (2011 film), a 2011 Marathi film
 Arjun: The Warrior Prince, a 2012 animated film
 Arjun: Kalimpong E Sitaharan, a 2013 Bengali film

Television 
 Earth Maiden Arjuna, a 2001 anime television series
 Arjun (TV series), a 2012 Indian crime based television series

Other
 Arjun (tank), an Indian main battle tank
 Arjun, Iran
 Arjuna asteroid, a class of near-Earth asteroids whose orbits are very Earth-like
 Arjuna Award, a national sports award in India
 Terminalia arjuna, a species of tree commonly known as Arjuna or Arjun tree

See also
 Arjoun, a town in Syria

Hindu given names
Indian masculine given names